Adina-Gina Rognean (born 28 May 1994) is a Romanian footballer who plays as a forward and has appeared for the Romania women's national team.

Career
Rognean has been capped for the Romania national team, appearing for the team during the 2019 FIFA Women's World Cup qualifying cycle.

References

External links
 
 
 

1994 births
Living people
Romanian women's footballers
Romania women's international footballers
Women's association football forwards